There's Room for Us All is the second album by the American musician Terrance Simien, released in 1993. It was recorded with Simien's band, the Mallet Playboys. Simien supported the album with a North American tour.

Production
Recorded at Sound Services, in New Orleans, the album was produced by Daryl Johnson. The recording sessions were casual, with Simien jamming with his band and not worrying about making a traditional zydeco album. "The Maker" was written by Daniel Lanois. The Meters backed Simien on a cover of Floyd King's "Groove Me". 

"Dog Hill" is a cover of the Boozoo Chavis song; "Love Land" is a cover of the Charles Wright & the Watts 103rd Street Rhythm Band song. "I Shall Be Released" is a rendition of the Bob Dylan song. The title track was inspired in part by the alarming rise of David Duke.

Critical reception

The Washington Post noted that Simien "doesn't help matters by including rap, gospel-soul, reggae, a Bob Dylan song and two collaborations with the Meters on this album ... Simien is competent at them all and superb at none." Rolling Stone called the album "delectable," writing that Simien "makes aural confetti of straight zydeco."

The Chicago Tribune stated that the album "pushes the boundaries of zydeco a bit with some reggae, soul and funk flavorings." The Los Angeles Times concluded that "the pace on this promising return sometimes drags when the mid-tempo R&B tunes aren't balanced with enough straight, up-tempo zydeco."

AllMusic wrote that "Simien is one of zydeco's Young Turks, but on this spectacular album he's more like Mr. Versatile."

Track listing

References

1993 albums
Black Top Records albums
Zydeco albums